Neonitocris princeps is a species of beetle in the family Cerambycidae. It was described by Karl Jordan in 1894, originally under the genus Nitocris. It has a wide distribution in Africa.

Subspecies
 Neonitocris princeps rhodesica Breuning, 1950
 Neonitocris princeps princeps (Jordan, 1894)

References

princeps
Beetles described in 1894